Schedule 2 may refer to:
 Schedule II Controlled Substances within the US Controlled Substances Act
 List of Schedule II drugs (US)
 Schedule II Controlled Drugs and Substances within the Canadian Controlled Drugs and Substances Act
 Schedule II Psychotropic Substances within the Thai Psychotropic Substances Act
 Schedule II Narcotic Drugs and Psychotropic Substances within the Estonian Narcotic Drugs and Psychotropic Substances Act
 Schedule II Psychotropic Substances within the U.N. Convention on Psychotropic Substances
 Schedule II Banks within the Canada Bank Act
 Schedule 2 Substances within the Chemical Weapons Convention

See also 
Schedule 1 (disambiguation)
Schedule 3 (disambiguation)
Schedule 4 (disambiguation)
Schedule 5 (disambiguation)